Alberto Noguera Ripoll (born 24 September 1989) is a Spanish professional footballer who plays as an attacking midfielder for Indian Super League club Mumbai City.

Club career

Atlético Madrid
Noguera was born in Madrid. After playing his first years as a senior with two clubs in the Community of Madrid, both in the Tercera División, he signed with Atlético Madrid in July 2009, initially being assigned to the C team also in that level.

After an impressive first season, Noguera was promoted to Atlético Madrid B in Segunda División B for the 2010–11 campaign. In the beginning of 2011, he was picked by manager Quique Sánchez Flores to train with the main squad and on 24 April he made his La Liga debut, coming on as a substitute for Elias for the last five minutes of a 4–1 home win against Levante UD.

Blackpool
On 14 August 2012, Noguera signed a two-year contract with Football League Championship side Blackpool, with an option for a third year. He made his debut on the 25th, playing the second half in a 6–0 victory over Ipswich Town at Bloomfield Road.

Noguera's contract with the Seasiders was terminated on 29 July 2013, by mutual consent. He left the club with only one official appearance to his credit.

Baku
At the end of August 2013, Noguera agreed to a one-year deal at FC Baku of the Azerbaijan Premier League. He scored his first professional goal on 15 February of the following year, netting the last in a 2–0 home defeat of Neftçi PFK.

Back to Spain
Following the expiration of his contract, Noguera returned to his homeland, joining CF Trival Valderas in the third tier. On 18 July 2015, he signed with CF Fuenlabrada of the same league.

Roughly one year later, Noguera moved to fellow league team Lorca FC. He achieved promotion to Segunda División in 2017, contributing three goals. He scored his first as a professional in his country on 11 March 2018, but in a 3–1 away loss against Real Zaragoza. The side would also be immediately relegated, after a 21st-place finish.

Noguera signed a two-year contract with CD Numancia on 26 June 2018. On 26 December, after being sparingly used, he was loaned to third-tier Racing de Santander until the following 30 June.

Goa
On 3 September 2020, Noguera joined Indian Super League's FC Goa on a two-year deal. He appeared with the club in the 2021 Durand Cup, playing in the semi-finals against Bengaluru FC (7–6 sudden death win) and the final against Mohammedan SC (1–0) as it won its first-ever trophy in the competition.

Mumbai City
Noguera continued in the Indian top division in the 2022–23 season, with the 32-year-old agreeing to a contract at Mumbai City FC. He made his first appearance on 18 August, winning the penalty for his team's second goal in an eventual 4–1 victory over Indian Navy in the Durand Cup.

Career statistics

Club

Honours
Goa
Durand Cup: 2021

Mumbai City
Durand Cup runner-up: 2022

References

External links

1989 births
Living people
Spanish footballers
Footballers from Madrid
Association football midfielders
La Liga players
Segunda División players
Segunda División B players
Tercera División players
Rayo Vallecano B players
CF Rayo Majadahonda players
UD San Sebastián de los Reyes players
Atlético Madrid C players
Atlético Madrid B players
Atlético Madrid footballers
CF Trival Valderas players
CF Fuenlabrada footballers
Lorca FC players
CD Numancia players
Racing de Santander players
English Football League players
Blackpool F.C. players
Azerbaijan Premier League players
FC Baku players
Indian Super League players
FC Goa players
Mumbai City FC players
Spanish expatriate footballers
Expatriate footballers in England
Expatriate footballers in Azerbaijan
Expatriate footballers in India
Spanish expatriate sportspeople in England
Spanish expatriate sportspeople in Azerbaijan
Spanish expatriate sportspeople in India